Leptobrachella tuberosa, also known as the granular toad, is a species of frog in the family Megophryidae. As currently known, it is endemic to the Central Highlands of Vietnam in Gia Lai, Quảng Nam, and Thừa Thiên–Huế Provinces. Its true range is probably wider as suitable habitat extends further north and east, reaching northeastern Cambodia and southeastern Laos. The specific name tuberosa is derived from the Latin tuberosus, meaning "full of protuberances".

Description
The overall appearance is stocky. The snout is obtusely pointed, rounded or truncate in profile. The tympanum is obscured by skin. The finger and toe tips are blunt; the toes have basal webbing. Skin is dorsally covered by many small tubercles of various sizes. In preserved specimens, the dorsum is dark grey or black with obscure light speckling that becomes heavier low on the sides. The venter is white with thin black lines. The limbs have darker crossbars.

Habitat and conservation
It is associated with rocky streams and herbaceous riparian vegetation. One male was observed calling from vegetation one metre above the ground by a cascading stream. This species presumably deposits its eggs in streams where the tadpoles will later develop.

Leptobrachella tuberosa has mostly been observed in undisturbed forest. Habitat loss and degradation is a general threat in the range of this species, and could also affect it. It is present in the Ngọc Linh and Song Thanh Nature Reserves in Vietnam. Its potential range in Laos overlaps with some other protected areas.

References

tuberosa
Frogs of Asia
Amphibians of Vietnam
Endemic fauna of Vietnam
Amphibians described in 1999
Taxa named by Ilya Darevsky
Taxa named by Robert F. Inger
Taxa named by Nikolai Loutseranovitch Orlov
Taxonomy articles created by Polbot